= Jamoniyachhir =

- village
- Location within Madhya Pradesh Location within India
- Coordinates: 23.260144°N 77.284720°E
- Country: India
- State: Madhya Pradesh
- District: Bhopal
- Tehsil: Huzur

Population (2011)
  - Total: 623
- Time zone: UTC+5:30 (IST)
- ISO 3166 code: MP-IN
- Census code: 482464

Jamoniyachhir is a village in the Bhopal district of Madhya Pradesh, India. It is located in the Huzur tehsil.

== Demographics ==
According to the 2011 census of India, Jamoniyachhir has 109 households. The effective literacy rate (i.e. the literacy rate of population excluding children aged 6 and below) is 72.64%.

Demographics (2011 Census)
	Total	Male	Female
Population	623	318	305
Children aged below 6 years	93	49	44
Scheduled caste	43	17	26
Scheduled tribe	0	0	0
Literates	385	236	149
Workers (all)	343	202	141
Main workers (total)	201	153	48
Main workers: Cultivators	57	45	12
Main workers: Agricultural labourers	13	8	5
Main workers: Household industry workers	0	0	0
Main workers: Other	131	100	31
Marginal workers (total)	142	49	93
Marginal workers: Cultivators	49	18	31
Marginal workers: Agricultural labourers	32	14	18
Marginal workers: Household industry workers	0	0	0
Marginal workers: Others	61	17	44
Non-workers	280	116	164
